The Yeya is a river in Krasnodar Krai, Russia. It falls into the Yeya Firth of Taganrog Bay, Sea of Azov. It dries up in summer. The port town of Yeysk is located by the Yeya Firth at the neck of the Yeya Spit.

References 

Rivers of Krasnodar Krai
Drainage basins of the Sea of Azov